Trendalyzer is an information visualization software for animation of statistics that was initially developed by Hans Rosling's Gapminder Foundation in Sweden. In March 2007 it was acquired by Google Inc. The current beta version is a Flash application that is preloaded with statistical and historical data about the development of the countries of the world.

The information visualization technique used by Trendalyzer is an interactive bubble chart. By default it shows five variables: Two numeric variables on the X and Y axes, bubble size and colour, and a time variable that may be manipulated with a slider.  The software uses brushing and linking techniques for displaying the numeric value of a highlighted country.

Components of the Trendalyzer software, particularly the Flash-based Motion Chart gadget, have become available for public use as part of the Google Visualizations API (see  ).

Similar projects 
 Trend Compass (flash)
 Eurostat explorer (flash)

References

External links 
 The Gapminder World, using Trendalyzer to display various statistics about the world's countries. A tab allows access to a download package
 Make Your Data Tell a Story: "Reports, tables, charts and dashboards all deliver information, but information alone isn't understanding"
 FAQ: How do I use Gapminder graphics in my presentation?: Implement Gapminder graphs in your presentation using Gapminder Tools Offline.
Webpage with Installation package for 2007 version
Example for visualization of environmental data (environmental accounting)

Google acquisitions
Plotting software
Data visualization software